Jordan Kale Barrett (born 2 December 1996) is an Australian fashion model. Models.com selected him as the "Model of the Year." Vogue has called Barrett the "Model It Boy of the new Era." Barrett also received the  "Man Of Style" award at The GQ Awards.

Career
Barrett was scouted when he was 14 by a model scout from IMG Australia. In September 2015, Barrett starred in an issue of VMAN magazine and Arena Homme+ SS Magazine, shot by Stephen Klein.

Barrett has featured in campaigns for Tom Ford, Balmain, Versace, Moschino as well as Coach. Collier Schorr in Collaboration with Barrett created "I BLAME JORDAN Book" for Moma PS1 New York. Jordan is the model of the new 1 Million fragrance spot.

Personal life
In August 2021 Barrett married fellow model Fernando Augusto Casablancas, son of the late eponymous modelling agency mogul John Casablancas, in Ibiza, Spain. In 2022, it was confirmed by Casablancas that the two had split.

References

External links
 Jordan Barrett Online

1996 births
Living people
People from the Northern Rivers
Australian male models
Australian gay men
Gay models